Copeland's is a restaurant chain started by New Orleans native Al Copeland in 1983. It offers New Orleans-style cuisine and a casual sit-down family friendly atmosphere.  Significantly expanding in the 1990s, it claimed more than 40 locations in 12 states and offered a "steakhouse"-style expanded menu by 2004.  It then significantly retracted over the next few years, closing half their restaurants with only 12 locations remaining in four states, with over half of their locations in Louisiana. The following years showed expansion west into Texas while adding the Copeland's Cheesecake Bistro, Fire and Ice restaurants, and Al's Diversified Food & Seasonings – a line of specialty foods and spices for large national restaurant chains.

Alvin C. Copeland 
Al Copeland (February 2, 1944 – March 23, 2008) was an American Louisianan raised entrepreneur who is, first and foremost, known for founding Popeyes Chicken and Biscuits in Arabi, Louisiana in 1972. Al Copeland also built up Al Copeland Investments which owns and operates a wide variety of concepts including restaurants such as Copeland's of New Orleans, Copeland's Cheesecake Bistro, and Copeland's Social City Bistro. ACI also operates a number of hotels in the New Orleans area including: Best Western French Quarter, Best Western Landmark, and Garden District. Food Service Plants and Comedy Clubs are also enterprises owned by ACI.

Menu 
Copeland's Restaurant Menu items include French and Cajun inspired dishes that include a focused number of steak and seafood dish specialties. It also offers a special Sunday Brunch menu. It enjoys a broad spectrum of diners at every range of the demographic. Popular dishes include Eggplant Pirogue, Veal Copeland, and Jambalaya Pasta among other classic Copeland concoctions.  There are also classic New Orleans dishes such as crawfish etouffee and shrimp Creole.

Recently, many Copeland's restaurants have started to specialize in particular styles of food, while some remain unchanged.

References

External links
Copeland's
Copeland's Cheesecake Bistro
Copeland's Social City Restaurant and Martini Lounge

Restaurants in Louisiana
Steakhouses in the United States
Restaurants established in 1983
1983 establishments in Louisiana
Restaurant chains in the United States
Food and drink companies of New Orleans